Billings Mill Brook (also known as Mill Brook or Billings Mill Creek) is a tributary of Tunkhannock Creek in Wyoming County, Pennsylvania, in the United States. The stream has one named tributary, which is known as Kern Glen Creek. The surficial geology in the vicinity of Billings Mill Brook mainly consists of Wisconsinan Till, alluvium, and several others. A lake known as Lake Carey is in the stream's watershed. A number of bridges have also been constructed over Billings Mill Brook. The stream's watershed is designated as a Coldwater Fishery and a Migratory Fishery.

Course

Billings Mill Brook begins in Helman Swamp in Lemon Township. It flows south-southwest through a valley for several tenths of a mile and enters Tunkhannock Township before turning south. After a few tenths of a mile, it turns southwest for a short distance before turning south-southeast. After several tenths of a mile, the stream turns south-southwest for several tenths of a mile before receiving Kern Glen Creek, its only named tributary, from the right. The stream then continues flowing south-southwest as its valley broadens. After several tenths of a mile, it reaches its confluence with Tunkhannock Creek.

Tributaries
Billings Mill Brook has one named tributary, which is known as Kern Glen Creek.

Geography and geology

A large mass of partially quarried sand and gravel occurs at the mouth of Billings Mill Brook. The surficial geology along the lower and middle reaches of the stream mainly consists of alluvium. However, there are patches of Wisconsinan Ice-Contact Stratified Drift at the mouth and alluvial fan further upstream. The surficial geology in the stream's upper reaches consists of a till known as Wisconsinan Till, which also lines its valley throughout its length. Wetlands, peat bogs, lakes, and bedrock consisting of sandstone and shale also occur in the watershed's surficial geology.

Billings Mill Brook flows through a valley known as Whippoorwill Hollow in its upper reaches. At the stream's headwaters, there is a swamp known as Helman Swamp, which is bordered by a small lake.

Watershed
The stream is entirely within the United States Geological Survey quadrangle of Tunkhannock. The mouth of the stream is located near Tunkhannock.

A lake known as Lake Carey is in the watershed of Billings Mill Brook. From the lake's outlet, water drops  over several rock ledge waterfalls to Billings Mill Brook.

History
Billings Mill Brook was entered into the Geographic Names Information System on August 2, 1979. Its identifier in the Geographic Names Information System is 1169625. The stream is also known as Mill Brook or Billings Mill Creek. The former variant name appears in Israel C. White's 1883 book The geology of the North Branch Susquehanna River Region in the six counties of Wyoming, Lackawanna, Luzerne, Columbia, Montour and Northumberland.

Historically, there was a grist and cider mill in the watershed of Billings Mill Brook.

Williams Companies and the Pennsylvania Department of Environmental Protection once worked together to carry out the Billings Mill Brook Stream Habitat Enhancement Project. This project improved streambank stability, reduced stream meander migration, and improved habitat quality. Williams Field Services Company, LLC. also once received a permit to construct a natural gas gathering pipeline in the vicinity of the stream.

Biology
The drainage basin of Billings Mill Brook is designated as a Coldwater Fishery and a Migratory Fishery. Wild trout naturally reproduce in the stream in its lower .

See also
Swale Brook, next tributary of Tunkhannock Creek going downstream
South Branch Tunkhannock Creek, next tributary of Tunkhannock Creek going upstream
List of rivers of Pennsylvania

References

External links
Waterfalls on Billings Mill Brook

Rivers of Wyoming County, Pennsylvania
Tributaries of Tunkhannock Creek
Rivers of Pennsylvania